The Mount Tabor Methodist Episcopal Church is a historic church building located along State Route 245 near West Liberty in Salem Township, Champaign County, Ohio, United States.  Built in 1881 in the Gothic Revival style of architecture, it served a congregation formed in the 1810s.  This congregation of the Methodist Episcopal Church worshipped in at least three different buildings before its closure.

Organic history
Methodism was established in Salem Township in 1814, and the congregation's first church building, a log structure, was constructed in 1816.  Beginning in that year and continuing for several more years, significant camp meetings were held at the church.  Among those who attended these meetings was Simon Kenton, who seems to have been present for a meeting in 1820.  In attendance for an 1818 meeting was John W. Ogden, then a six-year-old boy; reminiscing sixty years later, he wrote:

Architectural history
Among the leading members of Mount Tabor church in its earliest years was the family of Nathaniel and Ann Hunter; natives of Greenbrier County, Virginia, they relocated to Salem Township in 1814.  When the first church building was erected in 1816, Nathaniel and his four sons contributed greatly to the construction effort, and they were equally generous in the later construction of two successive brick structures at the site.  Built in 1881, the final structure was a Gothic Revival church built primarily of brick on a stone foundation, topped with a slate roof, and ornamented with wooden elements.  Like many other committed members of the church, this family — parents, all four sons, and all five daughters — is all buried at the adjacent cemetery.

Cemetery

From the Mount Tabor society's earliest years, members buried their dead near the site of the present church.  The earliest recorded burial on the site of the church's cemetery is that of a child who died in 1811; at that time, there were no plans to use the ground for religious purposes.  Individuals from many generations since have been buried in the cemetery: among the graves are those of veterans of the American Revolutionary War through World War II.  Among the grave markers are three fashioned from cast zinc; these are highly distinctive, for zinc markers were only manufactured for a few years near the end of the nineteenth century.

Recognition
In 1995, the Mount Tabor Methodist Episcopal Church, its cemetery, and an associated hitching lot were listed together on the National Register of Historic Places, due primarily to their architectural significance.  This designation is unusual, for both religious properties and cemeteries must pass higher standards than most other properties to be eligible for inclusion on the National Register.

References

Religious organizations established in 1814
Churches completed in 1881
1880s architecture in the United States
19th-century Methodist church buildings
19th-century Methodist church buildings in the United States
Cemeteries in Champaign County, Ohio
Cemeteries on the National Register of Historic Places in Ohio
Churches in Champaign County, Ohio
Former Methodist church buildings in the United States
Gothic Revival church buildings in Ohio
Methodist churches in Ohio 
National Register of Historic Places in Champaign County, Ohio
Churches on the National Register of Historic Places in Ohio
Unused buildings in Ohio
1814 establishments in Ohio